Vineet Joshi (born 2 November 1968) is currently the Director-General of National Testing Agency (NTA), which is responsible for conducting entrance examinations in India. He also served as the resident commissioner of Manipur Government.
IAS Vineet Joshi was re-appointed as the Chairman of Central Board of Secondary Education (CBSE) on February 14, 2022, after which he was succeeded by IAS Nidhi Chhibber.

Education and early life
He was educated at Annie Besant School, Allahabad, and GIC, Allahabad. Joshi pursued an undergraduate degree in mechanical engineering at IIT Kanpur and a Master of Business Administration from the Indian Institute of Foreign Trade. He belongs to 1992 batch IAS (Manipur cadre) and started service in the Youth Affairs and Sports department in Manipur. He joined the Ministry of Youth Affairs and Sports as private secretary in the 1999. From 2000 to 2001, he was the private secretary in the Ministry of Food Processing Industries. Late in 2010 and then again in 2022, he was appointed as the chairperson of Central Board of Secondary Education.

References

1969 births
Indian Administrative Service officers
People from Kanpur
Indian government officials
Living people